Moon Over Morocco (French: Les cinq gentlemen maudits) is a 1931 French mystery film directed by Julien Duvivier and starring Harry Baur, René Lefèvre and Rosine Deréan. A separate German-language film The Five Accursed Gentlemen was also produced.

The film's sets were designed by the art director Lazare Meerson.

Cast
 Harry Baur as M. de Marouvelle 
 René Lefèvre as Jacques Le Guérantec 
 Rosine Deréan as Françoise 
 Robert Le Vigan as Donald Strawber 
 Marc Dantzer as Sydney Woodland 
 Georges Péclet as Le capitaine Lawson 
 Jacques Erwin as Midlock 
 Allan Durant as Le sorcier
 Odette Barencey as Fille du sorcier 
 Mady Berry as Stéphanie, la gouvernante 
 Manou as Danseuse avec le serpent

Bibliography
 Rège, Philippe. Encyclopedia of French Film Directors, Volume 1. Scarecrow Press, 2009.

References

External links

1931 films
Films directed by Julien Duvivier
French mystery films
1930s French-language films
1931 mystery films
Films based on French novels
Films set in Morocco
Remakes of French films
Sound film remakes of silent films
French multilingual films
French black-and-white films
1931 multilingual films
1930s French films